Y Tenerte Otra Vez is a studio album released by Pepe Aguilar. This album became his first number one album on the Billboard Top Latin Albums chart.

Track listing
This track listing from Billboard.com
Me Falta Valor (Teodoro Bello) Valentine's Day — 3:36
Va Por Tu Suerte (Paulina Vargas) — 3:09
Alma en Pena (Miguel Luna) — 3:38
Yo la Amo (Luna) — 4:16
He Venido a Pedirte Perdón (Juan Gabriel) Santa Monica, California — 4:37
Mi Buen Corazón (Amanda Miguel/Graciela Carvallo) Los Angeles, California — 4:49
A Pierna Suelta (Martín Urieta) — 3:35
El Mecate (Manuel Monterrosas) — 2:38
Indispensable (Pepe Aguilar/Luna) — 4:21
Caída Libre (Manuel Eduardo Castro) — 3:35
El Hombre Es Hombre (Manuel Durán Durán) — 3:19
Y Tenerte Otra Vez (Juan Manuel Pernas/Aguilar) — 5:04
Y Ahora Olvídame (Jesús Monarrez) — 4:32
Mi Casa de Teja (Roberto Fausto) — 3:29

Chart performance

Sales and certifications

References

2003 albums
Pepe Aguilar albums